"Here Comes My Girl" is the ninth episode of the first season of the American television sitcom Cougar Town. It originally aired on November 25, 2009 in the United States on ABC.

Plot 
Jules's plan for a romantic dinner for two backfires for Thanksgiving. Travis shows off his girlfriend Kylie to everyone. Jules gives Travis and Kylie advice on birth control. Bobby and Grayson bond over a common interest.

Reception

Ratings and viewership 
In its original broadcast, "Here Comes My Girl" was watched by 5.53 million American viewers and attained a 1.9/6 rating/share in the 18–49 demographic.

Critical reception 
The episode received generally favorable reviews. Joel Keller, from TV Squad, said that he realizes "two things about the show: the more the show concentrates on the ensemble and less on Jules, the funnier it is" and that there's gotta be more "interaction between Courteney Cox and Dan Byrd," praising their acting in the episode.

References

2009 American television episodes
Cougar Town episodes
Thanksgiving television episodes